Disembody: The New Flesh is the second full-length studio album by American groove metal band Skinlab. It was recorded in El Paso, Texas at the Village Studios and was produced by Andy Sneap. The album was released February 23, 1999.

Track listing
 "So Far from the Truth" – 4:40
 "Know Your Enemies" – 3:05
 "No Sympathy (For the Devil)" – 3:50
 "Scapegoat" – 6:06
 "Breathe" – 3:35
 "I Name My Pain" – 4:15
 "Excellerate" – 2:35
 "Coward" – 3:57
 "Second Skin: New Flesh" – 5:09
 "Looks Can Be Deceiving" – 4:39

References

1999 albums
Skinlab albums
Century Media Records albums
Albums produced by Andy Sneap
Albums with cover art by Travis Smith (artist)